Garreta smaragdifer is a species of dung beetle native to India and Sri Lanka.

Description
This very broadly oval, convex species has an average length of about 17 to 18 mm. Body smooth, and shiny. Body color varies from dark blue tor greenish-blue. Head granulate and opaque whereas clypeus acutely notched in the middle. Pronotum and elytra very smooth and shiny. Pronotum sparsely punctured, whereas the front angles are minutely rugose and opaque. Elytra very finely striate and abdominal base is sharply carinate at the sides. Pygidium finely coriaceous and sub-opaque. In male, extremity of the front tibia is abruptly incurved and truncate.

References 

Scarabaeinae
Insects of Sri Lanka
Insects of India
Insects described in 1858